Grand Commanders of the Order of the Dannebrog have been appointed by the Sovereign of the Royal Danish Orders of Chivalry, i.e. the Danish monarch, since the general reorganization of the Order by royal letters patent of June 28, 1808. The Grand Commanders form a special class above the three ordinary classes of the Order of the Dannebrog. Thus, they outrank the Knights Grand Cross of the Dannebrog. Together with the Knights of the Order of the Elephant Grand Commanders constitute the Chapter of the Royal Danish Orders of Chivalry.

Grand Commanders are, or have been, either
 prominent members of the Danish Royal Family,
 kings and emperors related to the Danish monarch, or,
 other close relations of royal or princely status who are not members of the Danish Royal Family

Presently six persons wear the Grand Commander's insignia. They are the five Grand Commanders and Queen Margrethe II, the Sovereign of the Order.
By royal ordinance of October 10, 1951 women can be appointed Grand Commanders. Therefore, the women that appear in the list before that date were, strictly speaking, not appointed Grand Commanders as much as awarded the honour of wearing the insignia of a Grand Commander.

Grand Commanders of the Order of the Dannebrog

References

See also

Order of the Dannebrog
Order of the Elephant

Grand Commanders of the Dannebrog
 
Dannebrog
+